Chettle is a surname. Notable people with the surname include:

Callum Chettle (born 1996), English footballer
David Chettle (born 1951), Australian long-distance runner
Henry Chettle (c.1564–c.1606), English dramatist
Steve Chettle (born 1968), English footballer
Thomas Chettle (died c.1640), English politician